Gurbanguly Myratgulyyevich Ashirov (born 20 February 1993) is a Turkmen professional footballer who plays for FC Ahal. He was part of the Turkmenistan national team from 2017.

Club career 
In recent years he has been playing for the FC Ahal.

International career 
He played for Turkmenistan futsal team at 2013 Asian Indoor and Martial Arts Games and 2016 AFC Futsal Championship qualification.

Ashirov made his senior national team debut on 28 August 2017, in a friendly match against Qatar.

References

1993 births
Living people
Turkmenistan footballers
Turkmenistan international footballers
Futsal players
Association football defenders